Pannonictis is a genus of extinct mustelids. It is first known from the very Late Pliocene and survived until the end of the Villafranchian, and is most commonly recorded from deposits between 2.6 and 1.4 Ma. Remains of Pannonictis have been found throughout Eurasia, from the Iberian peninsula to eastern China.

Taxonomy
Pannonictis is closely related to another prehistoric genus, Enhydrictis. At least three species are recognized; P. pliocaenica, P. pachygnatha and P. nestii. Another species known as P. pilgrimi is no longer valid, and most likely a synonym of P. pliocaenica.

Description
As with many living mustelids, Pannonictis likely displayed pronounced sexual dimorphism. In fact, the small species known as P. pilgrimi is now often considered merely a female form of the larger P. pliocaenica. P. nestii was the smallest and most slender species of the genus as well as the latest surviving member. P. pachygnatha is a more robust species, with specific dental and mandible differences.

An otter-like aquatic lifestyle for Pannonictis is not likely, but it has been suggested it inhabited areas near river courses, much like their phylogenetic descendant, the living grison.

References

Pliocene carnivorans
Pleistocene carnivorans
Prehistoric mustelids
Pliocene mammals of Europe
Pleistocene mammals of Europe
Pliocene mammals of Asia
Pleistocene mammals of Asia
Prehistoric carnivoran genera